The Special Operations Forces Branch (SOFB) is a personnel branch of the Canadian Armed Forces, consisting of all members of special operations trades. Nearly all members of the SOFB are employed in Canadian Special Operations Forces Command (CANSOFCOM).

SOFB members wear service dress uniforms that are distinct from the navy, army and air force uniforms. The uniform consists of a dark olive five-button jacket, light olive trousers bloused over mid-calf black jump boots, light khaki shirt and olive tie, and a tan beret.

The branch badge was approved on July 20, 2017, which contains a V-42 stiletto (as do the badges of CANSOFCOM and the Canadian Special Operations Regiment) and the branch motto, .

References

2017 establishments in Canada
Military units and formations established in 2017
Canadian Armed Forces personnel branches